Solo Flight is an album by American jazz guitarist Charlie Byrd featuring tracks recorded in 1964 and released on the Riverside label.

Reception

Allmusic awarded the album 3 stars stating "Many fans of more progressive jazz will find this all a bit conservative, but Byrd fans happily note that his best work has a timeless quality. Solo Flight easily fits into that category.

Track listing
 "Am I Blue?" (Harry Akst, Grant Clarke) - 2:42     
 "Easy Living" (Ralph Rainger, Leo Robin) - 3:46     
 "The House of the Rising Sun" (Traditional) - 3:28     
 "Mood Indigo" (Barney Bigard, Duke Ellington, Irving Mills) - 3:26     
 "You Took Advantage of Me" (Lorenz Hart, Richard Rodgers) - 3:25     
 "Li'l Darlin'" (Neal Hefti) - 2:40     
 "Tears" (Stéphane Grappelli, Django Reinhardt) - 3:21     
 "Nocturne" (Franz Liszt) - 3:45     
 "Satin Doll"  (Ellington, Johnny Mercer, Billy Strayhorn) - 2:40     
 "Blue Mobile"  (Charlie Byrd) - 3:53     
 "Sweet Sue, Just You" (Will J. Harris, Victor Young) - 1:18

Personnel 
Charlie Byrd - guitar

References 

1964 albums
Charlie Byrd albums
Riverside Records albums